The Best of Rossa is a greatest hits album by Indonesian pop singer Rossa. It was released on November 30, 2011 by Trinity Optima Production. The album compiled eleven songs from seven previous studio albums with three new songs, "Jangan Ada Dusta Diantara Kita", "Tak Sanggup Lagi" and "One Night Lover". In marketing this album, Rossa and the record label working with KFC claimed that this album circulated in all KFC stores in Indonesia. The album has sold 1,400,000 units in Indonesia.

Track listing

References 

2011 compilation albums
Rossa (singer) albums
Compilation albums by Indonesian artists